Dictyla is a genus of lace bugs in the family Tingidae. There are at least 80 described species in Dictyla.

Species
These 86 species belong to the genus Dictyla:

 Dictyla abyssinica (Drake, 1954) i c g
 Dictyla affinis Duarte Rodrigues, 1987 i c g
 Dictyla aima Drake, 1961 i c g
 Dictyla ainsliei (Drake and Poor, 1938) i c g
 Dictyla alia Drake and Cobben, 1960 i c g
 Dictyla amitina (Horváth, 1925) i c g
 Dictyla aridula Linnavuori, 1961 i c g
 Dictyla aurigana (Drake, 1954) i c g
 Dictyla australis Duarte Rodrigues, 1987 i c g
 Dictyla balli (Drake, 1922) i c g
 Dictyla berryi (Drake, 1943) i c g
 Dictyla burgeoni (Schouteden, 1923) c g
 Dictyla cheriani (Drake, 1936) i c g
 Dictyla c-nigrum (Champion, 1898) i c g
 Dictyla collarti (Schouteden, 1953) i c
 Dictyla coloradensis (Drake, 1917) i c g
 Dictyla comes (Drake, 1948) i c g
 Dictyla compressicollis Péricart, 1981 i g
 Dictyla concinna Golub, 1979 i c g
 Dictyla convergens (Herrich-Schaeffer, 1835) i c g
 Dictyla dollingi Duarte Rodrigues, 1982 i c g
 Dictyla echii (Schrank, 1782) i c g b
 Dictyla ehrethiae (Gibson in Drake, 1917) i c g b (anacua lace bug)
 Dictyla eudia Drake and Quadri, 1964 i c g
 Dictyla evidens (Drake, 1923) i c g
 Dictyla femoralis (Stål, 1873) i c g
 Dictyla figurata (Drake, 1922) i c g
 Dictyla flavipes (Signoret, 1861) i c g
 Dictyla fulvescens (Kiritshenko, 1952) i c g
 Dictyla gerardi (Schouteden, 1953) i c
 Dictyla haitiensis (Drake and Poor, 1938) i c g
 Dictyla heissi Linnavuori and Péricart, 2006 i g
 Dictyla hessarghattaensis Livingstone and Jeyanthibai, 1994 i c g
 Dictyla humuli (Fabricius, 1794) i c g
 Dictyla imparis (Drake, 1954) i c g
 Dictyla indigena (Wollaston, 1858) i c g
 Dictyla jacobsi Duarte Rodrigues, 1990 i c g
 Dictyla labeculata (Uhler, 1893) i c g b
 Dictyla leporis (Drake, 1937) i c g
 Dictyla lithospermi Ribes, 1967 i c g
 Dictyla litotes Drake and Hill, 1964 i c g
 Dictyla loricata (Distant, 1888) i c g
 Dictyla lupata (Drake and Poor, 1936) i c g
 Dictyla lupudi (Herrich-Schaeffer, 1837) c g
 Dictyla lupuli (Herrich-Schaeffer, 1837) i g
 Dictyla minuta Golub, 1976 i c g
 Dictyla monotropidia (Stål, 1858) i c g
 Dictyla montandoni (Horváth, 1885) i c g
 Dictyla nassata (Puton, 1874) i c g
 Dictyla nigra Golub, 1982 i c g
 Dictyla nodipennis (Horváth, 1910) i c g
 Dictyla novaki Drake and Ruhoff, 1962 i c g
 Dictyla orientalis Golub, 1982 i c g
 Dictyla parilis (Drake, 1936) i c g
 Dictyla parmata (Distant, 1888) i c g
 Dictyla patquiana (Drake, 1955) i c g
 Dictyla pauliani Duarte Rodrigues, 1992 i c g
 Dictyla picturata (Distant, 1902) i c g
 Dictyla platyoma (Fieber, 1861) i c g
 Dictyla poecilla Drake and Hill, 1964 i c g
 Dictyla pongana (Drake, 1953) i c g
 Dictyla pucallpana (Drake and Hambleton, 1945) i c g
 Dictyla putoni (Montandon, 1895) i c g
 Dictyla rasilis (Drake and Maa, 1955) i c g
 Dictyla rotundata (Herrich-Schaeffer, 1835) i g
 Dictyla ruficeps (Horváth, 1905) i c g
 Dictyla sahlbergi (Horváth, 1906) i g
 Dictyla salhbergi (Horvath, 1906) c g
 Dictyla salicorum (Baba, 1925) i c g
 Dictyla sauteri (Drake, 1923) i c g
 Dictyla schoutedeni Duarte Rodrigues, 1979 i c g
 Dictyla senegalensis Duarte Rodrigues, 1979 i c g
 Dictyla seorsa (Drake and Poor, 1937) i c g
 Dictyla sessoris (Drake and Poor, 1937) i c g
 Dictyla sima Seidenstücker, 1975 i c g
 Dictyla sjoestedti (Horváth, 1910) i g
 Dictyla sjostedti (Horváth, 1910) c g
 Dictyla subdola (Horváth, 1905) i c g
 Dictyla theroni Duarte Rodrigues, 1988 i c g
 Dictyla triconula (Seidenstücker, 1954) i c g
 Dictyla tuberosa (Horváth, 1929) i c g
 Dictyla uichancoi (Drake and Poor, 1937) i c g
 Dictyla uniseriata (Horváth, 1929) i c g
 Dictyla variabilis Duarte Rodrigues, 1976 i c g
 Dictyla veterna (Scudder, 1890) i c g
 Dictyla wollastoni (Heer, 1865) i c g

Data sources: i = ITIS, c = Catalogue of Life, g = GBIF, b = Bugguide.net

References

Further reading

External links

 

Tingidae